Vasilije Kalezić (born 1959) is a Montenegrin retired football midfielder who played in several clubs in Yugoslav First and Second League.

Club career
Born in Jastreb, a location within the municipality of Danilovgrad, he started playing in 1976 in the second-level side OFK Titograd before moving to Budućnost Titograd and playing with them in the Yugoslav First League. Later he played with Čelik Zenica, Trepča and Ivangrad.

References

External links
 

1959 births
Living people
People from Danilovgrad Municipality
Association football midfielders
Yugoslav footballers
OFK Titograd players
FK Budućnost Podgorica players
NK Čelik Zenica players
FK Trepča players
FK Berane players
Yugoslav First League players
Yugoslav Second League players